"It's My Beat" is the debut single by American rapper Sweet Tee and DJ Jazzy Joyce, released in 1986 via Profile Records. In 1988, it was included on Sweet Tee's debut album It's Tee Time. Produced by Hurby "Luv Bug" Azor, who also has writing credits for the song alongside Sweet Tee, the single was later released in the UK through Champion Records.

In February 1987, "It's My Beat" had an entry at  98 on the UK Singles Chart. In the end of year-roundups, the song placed at  19 in The Face list of best singles of 1987.

In 1999, Ego Trips editors ranked "It's My Beat" at  20 in their list of Hip Hop's 40 Greatest Singles by Year 1986 in Ego Trip's Book of Rap Lists.

Conception and composition 
Sweet Tee has told in an interview with The Hype Magazine in 2020 that she met Hurby Luv Bug Azor in a club in Manhattan, who asked her to record a song:

Regarding Jazzy Joyce's work on the song Sweet Tee would say "Jazzy Joyce is an incredible female DJ that I saw playing in the park one day. I asked her to be part of the camp, and I went back in the studio and added a fourth verse to the song with her name in it."

Samples

Single track listing

7" Vinyl

A-Side
 "It's My Beat" (4:58)

B-Side
 "It's My Beat" (Instrumental) (5:04)

12" Vinyl

A-Side
 "It's My Beat" (4:58)

B-Side
 "It's My Beat" (Instrumental) (5:04)
 "It's My Beat" (A Cappella) (1:52)

Personnel
Credits are taken from the liner notes and the official page of the ASCAP.
Written By – Toi Jackson, Hurby Azor
Producer – Hurby Luv Bug and the Invincibles
Mixed By – Hurby Luv Bug
Mastered By – Howie Weinberg
Recorded By – Patrick Adams
Phonographic Copyright ℗ – Profile Records, Inc.
Manufactured By – Profile Records, Inc.
Distributed By – Profile Records, Inc.
Published By – Protoons, Inc.
Published By – Turn Out Brothers Publishing
Engineered At – Power Play Studios
Mixed At – Bayside Recordings
Mastered At – Masterdisk

References

1986 songs
1986 debut singles
Champion Records singles
Profile Records singles
American hip hop songs
Songs written by Hurby Azor